The 2020–21 DEL2 season was the eighth season since the founding of the DEL2, the second tier of German ice hockey, set below the Deutsche Eishockey Liga (DEL). The season began on a delayed start date of 6 November 2020 after being rescheduled from 2 October 2020, and concluded with the end of the playoffs on 22 May 2021. Due to the ongoing COVID-19 pandemic, DEL2 along with DEL and DEB agreed to a set of health rules and guidelines to ensure a safe and consistent work environment for everyone involved with hockey in Germany. Fans were excluded from attending matches. The DEL2 board agreed to suspend relegation to the Oberliga for the season, resulting in no relegation play-offs being contested. The season also marked the first time the league implemented promotion to DEL.

Teams

In 2020–21 the DEL2 had 14 teams competing in the league.

Format

Fourteen teams competed in the 2019–20 DEL2 regular season that ran from 6 November 2020 to 11 April 2021. No team was promoted or relegated to Oberliga. Each team played each other twice in the regular season, home and away, for a total of 52 matches each. The top eight teams qualified for the championship playoffs, played in a best of five format.

For the first time in DEL2 history, sporting promotion to DEL was introduced. Relegation from DEL to DEL2 was suspended for the season. Financial account examination was an additional requirement for the DEL2 champion to obtrain a DEL licence to secure promotion. Löwen Frankfurt, EC Kassel Huskies and Bietigheim Steelers all applied for their financial accounts to be examined.

Regular season

Results

Standings

Top scorers
These are the top-ten scorers in DEL2 for the 2020–21 season. (Table is created at the conclusion of the DEL2 regular season)

Top goaltenders
These are the top-ten goaltenders in DEL2 for the 2020–21 season. (Table is created at the conclusion of the DEL2 regular season)

Playoffs

Due to the ongoing coronavirus situation, the relegation play-offs were suspended for the season. The championship play-offs saw the DEL2 champion qualify for promotion to DEL for the first time, as long as the winning team also met financial requirements to obtain a DEL licence.

Championship
The championship playoffs reference:

The championship playoffs ran from 22 April 2021 to 22 May 2021. The top eight teams from the regular season qualified and played best-of-five series. Teams were reseeded following the quarter-finals, which meant that Ravensburg, the only lower seed to advance, had to face top seed Kassel in the semi-finals. In the finals, Bietigheim came back from two games down to win the series and the DEL2 championship, 3 games to 2. 

Note: All numbers represent series results, not a match score

References

External links

 Official website
 Official Facebook
 Elite Prospects home

2020-21 DEL2
Germany
2020–21 in German ice hockey